Serafín Martínez Acevedo (born 14 February 1984 in O Rosal) is a Spanish road cyclist who rode for the continental team Xacobeo–Galicia between 2007 and 2010. Since they have folded he has been without a team.

External links

1984 births
Living people
People from O Baixo Miño
Sportspeople from the Province of Pontevedra
Cyclists from Galicia (Spain)
Spanish male cyclists
21st-century Spanish people